Delphyre tetilla is a moth of the subfamily Arctiinae. It was described by Paul Dognin in 1898. It is found in Ecuador, Colombia and Peru.

References

Euchromiina
Moths described in 1926